Mosher Joseph Blumenfeld (March 23, 1904 – November 5, 1988) was a United States district judge of the United States District Court for the District of Connecticut.

Education and career

Born on March 23, 1904, in Saint Paul, Minnesota, Blumenfeld received at Bachelor of Arts degree in 1925 from the University of Minnesota and a Bachelor of Laws in 1928 from Harvard Law School. He entered private practice in Hartford, Connecticut from 1928 to 1961. He was a Special Assistant to the United States Attorney for the District of Connecticut from 1942 to 1946.

Federal judicial service

Blumenfeld was nominated by President John F. Kennedy on August 7, 1961, to the United States District Court for the District of Connecticut, to a new seat authorized by 75 Stat. 80. He was confirmed by the United States Senate on August 15, 1961, and received his commission on August 15, 1961. He served as Chief Judge from 1971 to 1974. He assumed senior status on January 20, 1977. His service terminated on November 5, 1988, due to his death in Hartford.

See also
 List of Jewish American jurists

References

Sources
 

1904 births
1988 deaths
Judges of the United States District Court for the District of Connecticut
United States district court judges appointed by John F. Kennedy
20th-century American judges
Harvard Law School alumni
University of Minnesota alumni